Bald Head is headland on the south side of Trinity Peninsula on the Antarctic Peninsula in Antarctica.

Bald Head or Baldhead may also refer to:

Place 
Bald Head River (Newfoundland)
Baldhead River (Ontario)
Bald Head, Maine, a village
Bald Head Island, North Carolina, a village in North Carolina
Bald Head Light, a lighthouse in North Carolina
Yokun Ridge or Baldhead, a ridge in Massachusetts
Mount Baldhead, a peak in Saugatuck, Michigan

Other 
Baldness, the loss of hair
"Bald Head", song by Professor Longhair

See also
Skinhead, a subculture
Bald (disambiguation)